Sorangel Matos Arce (born January 2, 1986) is a Panamenian beauty pageant titleholder. She was the official representative of Panamá to the Miss Universe 2007 pageant, held in Mexico City, Mexico on May 28, 2007;.

Pageant participation
Miss Tourism Queen International 2006
Matos represented Panama at the Miss Tourism Queen International Pageant in Shanghai - China

Reina Del Carnaval De Panama 2007

Señorita Panama 2007
Matos competed in the national beauty pageant Miss Panama 2007, representing the state of Darien.
On March 19, 2007, she won the Miss Panama contest, becoming the first woman from the state of Darien to win the title.

Miss Continentes Unidos 2007
Matos represented Panama at the Miss Continentes Unidos Pageant in Guayaquil - Ecuador.

Matos speaks Spanish, English, Italian, Portuguese and is 5'8 (1.75m)

References

https://sorangelmatos.tumblr.com

External links
Miss Panamá Official Website
Miss Universe Official Website

1986 births
Living people
Panamanian beauty pageant winners
Miss Universe 2007 contestants
Panamanian female models